Congregation Ramath Orah is an Orthodox synagogue located in Manhattan's Upper West Side, close to Columbia University. It occupies a neo-Georgian building on West 110th Street, originally built in 1921 as the first stage of a large West Side Unitarian Church.

It is the synagogue portrayed in Ari L. Goldman's book, Living a Year of Kaddish.

History
The congregation was founded in 1942 by Rabbi Dr. Robert Serebrenik, his wife Mrs. Julia Serebrenik (née  Herzog), and  sixty-one other Jewish refugees from Luxembourg. Serebrenik, who was born in Vienna in 1902, had been Chief Rabbi of Luxembourg since 1929.  About 1000 Jews fled into France at the time of the German invasion of Luxembourg, May 10, 1940.  Luxembourg had approximately 4,000 Jewish residents at the beginning of WWII, about half of whom had recently sought refuge there from Nazi countries.  Rabbi and Mrs. Serebrenik stayed and organized a series of clandestine escapes of about 2,000 members of the Jewish population into southern, unoccupied France and elsewhere.  On March 20, 1941, Serebrenik met in Berlin with Adolf Eichmann who demanded that Luxembourg must be “Judenrein”, and was given eleven days to complete the emigration of the Jewish population from Luxembourg.  Serebrenik managed to secure the exit of a further 250 Jews before he and his wife were driven out by the Gestapo.  According to the New York Times, Serebrenik stayed, working to secure visas for more Jews, “until he was seized by the Gestapo and beaten unconscious.”

With the new century,  Ramath Orah experienced a revival with a dynamic, young Rabbi Stephen Friedman.  The Columbia Spectator describes it as “very popular among Columbia students who want a spirited, liberal, Orthodox service."

The Hebrew name Ramath Orah is said to reflect a translation of the name Luxembourg as Mountain of Light, although the former's etymology is a Germanic name meaning little castle.

Notable members

 Rabbi Robert Serebrenik
 Rabbi Saul Berman
 Professor Paul S. Appelbaum
 Professor Ester Fuchs
 Professor Ari L. Goldman
 Professor Louis Henkin
 Professor Diana Muir Appelbaum
 Professor Adam Zachary Newton
 Rabbi Ismar Schorsch
 Rabbi Joseph Telushkin
 Dean David Schizer

Other

Ramath Orah is the synagogue described in Ari L. Goldman’s book, Living a Year of Kaddish.

See also

History of the Jews in Luxembourg

External links

References

Ashkenazi Jewish culture in New York (state)
Luxembourgian-American history
Modern Orthodox synagogues in the United States
Orthodox synagogues in New York City
Synagogues in Manhattan